Peck's Bad Girl is a 1918 comedy film directed by Charles Giblyn, written by Tex Charwate, produced by Samuel Goldwyn, and starring Mabel Normand and Earle Foxe. The black and white silent film, in the style of the Peck's Bad Boy stories, was released by the Goldwyn Pictures Corporation (a forerunner of Metro-Goldwyn-Mayer) in 35mm on September 2, 1918.  The picture's running time is 50 minutes.

The status of this film is that it is now lost.

There was also a 1959 TV series titled Peck's Bad Girl with an unrelated story, starring Wendell Corey & Patty McCormack.

Plot
As described in a film magazine, Peck's girl Minnie (Normand) gets into so much mischief that the wiseacres of the town decide that she needs to be put to some useful occupation. A kindly lady takes her under her care and she soon becomes a more or less valuable assistant to a modiste's show. Returning to the store one evening to get a package, she comes across some sneak thieves who are burrowing beneath the bank. She spreads the alarm, captures one of the crooks, and wins the heart of a detective sent to apprehend the criminals.

Cast
Mabel Normand as Minnie Penelope Peck
Earle Foxe as Dick
Corinne Barker as Hortense Martinot
Blanche Davenport as Miss Olivia
Riley Hatch as Adam Raskell
Leslie Hunt as Willie Raskell
Eddie Sturgis as Pearson
Joseph Granby as Walker
Edward M. Favor as Peck (billed as E.M. Favor)
F.G. Patton as Sheriff
Auge Becker as Constable

References

External links

Peck's Bad Girl at Paperspast

1918 films
1918 comedy films
Silent American comedy films
American silent feature films
Films directed by Charles Giblyn
American black-and-white films
Goldwyn Pictures films
Lost American films
1918 lost films
Lost comedy films
1910s American films